Syrastrenoides is a monotypic moth genus in the family Lasiocampidae erected by Matsumura in 1927. Its single species, Syrastrenoides horishana, described by the same author in the same year, is found in Taiwan.

References

Lasiocampidae
Monotypic moth genera